Samuel Simon Gordon (April 21, 1878 – November 30, 1962) was an American Negro league first baseman between 1908 and 1913.

A native of Fraziers Bottom, West Virginia, Gordon attended Wabash College. He made his Negro leagues debut in 1908 with the Indianapolis ABCs, and went on to play for the Leland Giants, Chicago Giants, and French Lick Plutos. Gordon died in Beckley, West Virginia in 1962 at age 84.

References

External links
Baseball statistics and player information from Baseball-Reference Black Baseball Stats and Seamheads

1878 births
1960 deaths
Chicago Giants players
French Lick Plutos players
Indianapolis ABCs players
Leland Giants players
Baseball first basemen
Baseball players from West Virginia
People from Putnam County, West Virginia
20th-century African-American sportspeople